Phacelia stebbinsii is an uncommon species of phacelia known by the common name Stebbins' phacelia.

Distribution
The plant is endemic to California, where it is known only from a northern section of the Sierra Nevada in El Dorado County.

Description
Phacelia stebbinsii  is an annual herb producing a mostly unbranched stem 10 to 40 centimeters tall. It is lightly hairy and sometimes glandular. The leaves are oval or lance-shaped and some have lobed edges.

The hairy inflorescence is a one-sided curving or coiling cyme of bell-shaped flowers. Each flower is around half a centimeter long and white to light blue in color with protruding stamens.

References

Further reading
Constance, L. & L. R. Heckard. (1970). Two new species of Phacelia (Hydrophyllaceae) from California. Brittonia 22:1 25–30.

External links
Calflora database: Phacelia stebbinsii (Stebbins' phacelia)
Jepson Manual eFlora treatment
Phacelia stebbinsii — U.C. Photos gallery

stebbinsii
Endemic flora of California
Flora of the Sierra Nevada (United States)
Natural history of El Dorado County, California
Plants described in 1970
Taxa named by Lincoln Constance
Flora without expected TNC conservation status